General José María Morelos y Pavón is an inhabited Locality Rural in the state of Aguascalientes. It is located 10 miles northeast of the city of Aguascalientes and has a population of 2,500.

External links

References

Populated places in Aguascalientes